Thomas Beverly Randolph (1793 - November 12, 1867) was an American military officer who graduated from the United States Military Academy.  He served during the War of 1812, resigning from the army in 1815, later returning to military service with the Virginia militia, serving as a cavalry colonel from 1822 until 1829 and as a brigadier general 1829 until 1834.  Randolph served as Sergeant at Arms of the United States House of Representatives from 1833 until 1835.  He served under Zachary Taylor during the Mexican–American War.  Watkins refused a general's commission in the Confederate service while residing at his son's home in Missouri.  Missouri Governor Claiborne Fox Jackson and Confederate sympathizer had appointed him as a district/division commander for the state.

See also
 Sergeant at Arms of the United States House of Representatives
 First Families of Virginia
 Randolph family of Virginia

References

1793 births
1867 deaths
American military personnel of the Mexican–American War
United States Army personnel of the War of 1812
United States Army officers
Sergeants at Arms of the United States House of Representatives